Mariusz Krzysztof Wieczorek (born 14 March 1976 in Opoczno) is a Polish slalom canoeist who competed at the international level from 1992 to 2005.

He won a gold medal in the C1 team event at the 1999 ICF Canoe Slalom World Championships in La Seu d'Urgell. He also won an individual gold and a team bronze at the 2002 European Championships in Bratislava.

Wieczorek competed in two Summer Olympics, earning his best finish of 11th in the C1 event in Atlanta in 1996.

World Cup individual podiums

References

1976 births
Canoeists at the 1996 Summer Olympics
Canoeists at the 2004 Summer Olympics
Living people
Olympic canoeists of Poland
Polish male canoeists
People from Opoczno
Sportspeople from Łódź Voivodeship
Medalists at the ICF Canoe Slalom World Championships